The 2022 Israeli legislative election was held using closed list proportional representation. Each party presented a list of candidates to the Central Elections Committee prior to the election.

Balad
The Balad list is headed by Sami Abu Shehadeh.

Sami Abu Shehadeh 
Mtanes Shehadeh 
Dua Hush Tatour 
Walid Kadan
Mahasen Kis
Einat Weizman Diamond

Hadash–Ta'al
The Hadash–Ta'al list is headed by Ayman Odeh.

Ayman Odeh 
Ahmad Tibi 
Aida Touma-Suleiman 
Ofer Cassif 
Youssef Atauna 
Samir Bin Said 
Ghalib Seif
Etimad Kadan

The Jewish Home
The Jewish Home list is headed by Yamina leader Ayelet Shaked.

Ayelet Shaked
Yossi Brodny 
Amitai Porat 
Nitsana Darshan-Leitner 
Yomtob Kalfon 
Orna Starkmann

Labor
The Israeli Labor Party list is headed by Merav Michaeli.

Merav Michaeli
Naama Lazimi
Gilad Kariv
Efrat Rayten
Ram Shefa
Emilie Moatti
Yair Fink
Ibtisam Mara'ana
Omer Bar-Lev 
Mehereta Baruch-Ron
Amir Khnifess
Maya Nouri

Alassa Baruch-Yasso

Hadas Shaharabani Saidon
Nachman Shai
Alice Goldman
Tomer Avital
Dina Dayan
Gil Beilin
Einat Colman
Yair Tarchitsky
Kobi Kisos
Sari Yerushalmi
Farhan Abu-Riash
Simon Alfasi
Baruch Lagziel

Likud
The Likud list is headed by Benjamin Netanyahu.

Benjamin Netanyahu
Yariv Levin
Eli Cohen
Yoav Galant
Dudi Amsalem
Amir Ohana
Yoav Kisch
Nir Barkat
Miri Regev
Miki Zohar
Avi Dichter
Yisrael Katz
Shlomo Karhi
Amichai Chikli
Danny Danon
Idit Silman
David Bitan
Yuli Edelstein
Eliyahu Revivo
Galit Distel-Atbaryan
Nissim Vaturi
Shalom Danino
Haim Katz
Ofir Akunis
Tali Gottlieb
Hanoch Milwidsky
Boaz Bismuth
Moshe Saada
Eli Dellal
Gila Gamliel
Ofir Katz
May Golan
Dan Illouz
Ariel Kallner
Eti Atiya
Amit Halevi
Tsega Melaku
Osher Shekalim
Keti Shitrit
Moshe Passal
Shashi Guetta
Avihai Boaron
Yossi Fuchs
Ayoob Kara
Shabtai Ketesh
Tzachi Hanegbi

Keren Barak

Orly Levy-Abekasis
Uzi Dayan
Dorit Ohana
Moshe Feiglin

Meretz
The Meretz list is headed by Zehava Gal-On.

Zehava Gal-On
Mossi Raz
Michal Rozin
Ali Salalha
Yair Golan 
Gaby Lasky
Nitzan Horowitz 
Mazen Abu Siam 
Umaima Hamed
Ayid Badar

National Unity Party
The National Unity Party list is headed by Benny Gantz.

Benny Gantz 
Gideon Sa'ar
Gadi Eisenkot
Pnina Tamano-Shata
Yifat Shasha-Biton
Hili Tropper
Ze’ev Elkin
Michael Biton
Matan Kahana
Orit Farkash-Hacohen
Sharren Haskel
Alon Schuster
Michel Buskila
Eitan Ginzburg
Yael Ron Ben-Moshe
Akram Hasson
Inbar Yehezkeli
Inbar Harush Giti
Mufid Mari
Dovrat Weizer
Gilad Kabilo
Ruth Wasserman Lande
Shirly Pinto
Alon Tal
Shlomi Yehiav
Zohar Tal

Religious Zionism
The Religious Zionism list is headed by Bezalel Smotrich.

Bezalel Smotrich
Itamar Ben-Gvir
Ofir Sofer
Orit Strook
Yitzhak Wasserlauf
Simcha Rothman
Almog Cohen
Michal Waldiger 
Amihai Eliyahu
Zvika Fogel
Avi Maoz
Ohad Tal
Limor Son Har-Melech
Moshe Solomon
Yitzhak Kroizer
Zvi Sukkot
Tzachi Eliyahu
Yitzhak Hai Zaga
Moshe Ben Zikri
Arnon Segal
Dror Meir Ohana
Devora Gonen
Ofra Shuraki
Naama Zarbiv

Shas
The Shas list is headed by Aryeh Deri.

Aryeh Deri
Ya'akov Margi
Yoav Ben-Tzur
Michael Malchieli
Haim Biton
Moshe Arbel
Yinon Azulai
Moshe Abutbul
Uriel Buso
Yosef Taieb
Avraham Betzalel
Yonatan Mishraki
Netanel Haik
Erez Melol
Simeon Moshiashvili
Meir Galant
Yaakov Tzedaka
Tal Matityahu

United Arab List
The United Arab List list is headed by Mansour Abbas.

Mansour Abbas
Walid Taha
Walid al-Huashla
Iman Khatib-Yasin
Yasser Hujirat
Abdel Karim Masri
Ata Abu Madighan
Ibrahim Abu Laben

United Torah Judaism
The United Torah Judaism list is headed by Yitzhak Goldknopf.

Yitzhak Goldknopf
Moshe Gafni
Meir Porush
Uri Maklev
Ya'akov Tessler
Ya'akov Asher
Yisrael Eichler
Yitzhak Pindrus
Moshe Roth
Eliyahu Baruchi
Binyamin Hershler
David Ohana

Yesh Atid
The Yesh Atid list is headed by Yair Lapid.

Yair Lapid
Orna Barbivai
Meir Cohen
Karine Elharrar
Meirav Cohen
Yoel Razvozov
Elazar Stern
Mickey Levy
Meirav Ben-Ari
Ram Ben Barak
Yoav Segalovich
Boaz Toporovsky
Michal Shir
Idan Roll
Yorai Lahav-Hertzano
Vladimir Beliak
Ron Katz
Matti Sarfati Harkavi
Tania Mazarsky
Yasmin Fridman
Debbie Biton
Moshe Tur-Paz
Simon Davidson
Naor Shiri
Shelly Tal Meron
Yaron Levi
Adi Azuz
Oz Haim
Mohammed Elhega
Michal Slawny Cababia
Roni Malkai
Tomer Viner
Ronit Ernefroind
Sagit Gamliel
Hana Gol
Lydia Hatuel-Czuckermann

Yisrael Beiteinu
The Yisrael Beiteinu list is headed by Avigdor Lieberman.

Avigdor Lieberman
Oded Forer
Evgeny Sova
Sharon Nir
Yulia Malinovsky
Hamad Amar
Alex Kushnir
Batya Kahana-Dror
Yossi Shain
Limor Magen Telem
Elina Bardach-Yalov
Sharon Roffe Ofir

See also 
List of political parties in Israel

References

2022
Party lists